Aldeire is a town located in the province of Granada, Spain. According to the 2016 census (INE), the city has a population of 639 inhabitants.

The municipality is split into two non-contiguous parts, having an exclave to the north called "Cortijo Ramos" - surrounded by Valle del Zalabí and La Calahorra municipalities.

A 150-megawatt CSP plant, Central Termosolar Andasol, is located within the "Cortijo Ramos" area.

References

Municipalities in the Province of Granada